Chushul is a village in the Leh district of Ladakh, India. It is located in the Durbuk tehsil, in the area known as "Chushul Valley", south of the Pangong Lake and west of the Spanggur Lake. The Line of Actual Control with China runs about 5 miles east of Chushul, across the Chushul Valley. Famous as site for historical battle grounds.

In August 1842 the concluding battle of Dogra-Tibetan War with subsequent signing of Treaty of Chushul in September 1842 for border non-proliferation took place at Chushul.

On 18 November 1962 Sino-Indian War, PVC Major Shaitan Singh with his five platoons of 120 men fought to the 'last man, last round' at Rezang La (Chushul), only 6 men survived the Chinese massacre.

Location 

Chushul is about 10 miles south of the Pangong Lake. It is in the valley of the Chushul River (or Tsaka chu), which rises near the Tsaka La and flows north for about 30 miles before entering the Pangong Lake on its south bank near Thakung. Near Chushul, the river flows through a flat plain of some 10 square miles in extent, leading to growth of grass and fuelwood.

Demographics
According to the 2011 census of India, Chushul has 148 households. The effective literacy rate (i.e. the literacy rate of population excluding children aged 6 and below) is 61.47%.

Most of the people are dependent on the rearing of goat and yak. In the field of agriculture, barley and pea are main crops of the season. During the chilly winter season, Chushul is cut off from main the capital city of Leh. During the winter season, Ice hockey is the main sport in Chushul. The youth of Chushul has a keen interest in playing ice hockey. The Chushul Ice Hockey team recently participated in the district as well as the CEC cup which was held at Leh at Karzoo and the new ice hockey ring at NDS Ground. In Chushul, various associations have played an important role in developing Chushul's economy, politics and education system. Some of these associations are Women's Alliance Chushul, Student Union of Chushul, Youth Association of Chushul, Gonpa Community of Chushul and Ex. Service Men Association of Chushul. Ms Tsering Dolker is the current elected sarpanch of Chushul village.

Education
In Chushul there are five schools. They are Govt. High school Chushul, Govt. Middle school Buk, Govt Middle School Tailing, Central Institute of Buddhist Studies .

Administration 
The Chushul village was the block headquarters of Changthang block of Ladakh district prior to the 1962 war with China.

Airport
 

The Chushul airstrip became operational since 1954. Chushul airstrip, supported military operations during the 1962 Sino-Indian War.   Dakotas and IL 14 from No. 12 Squadron IAF, No. 43 Squadron IAF and No. 42 Squadron IAF made logistical supplies to Chushul as the roads didn't exist.
On 25 & 26 October 1962 in Sino-Indian War,  AN-12 transport airplanes of No. 44 Squadron IAF airlifted six AMX-13 tanks to armour the gap at Spanggur Tso through makeshift Chushul aerodrome made of (Perforated Steel Plates) fishplates at a height of 13,000 feet in Ladakh. Vir Chakra awardee Flight Lieutenant Virendera Singh Pathania of No. 23 Squadron IAF made sorties on Gnat airplane for photo reconnaissance from Chushul.

Highway

Chushul-Dungti-Fukche-Demchok highway (CDFD road), along the southern bank of Indus river which marks the LAC, will be converted to a single-lane 7.45 m wide 135 km long national highway with paved shoulder by 31 March 2025. Chushul and Fukche Airstrips lies along this highway. It will also provide faster access to the Nyoma airbase. This will boost military logistics and tourism in the border area.

Border Personnel Meeting point 
Chushul is one of the five officially agreed Border Personnel Meeting points between the Indian Army and the People's Liberation Army of China for regular consultations and interactions between the two armies to improve relations.

Moldo post of the Indian Army, coordinate: 

Spanggur post of the People's Liberation Army of China, coordinate:

See also
 Border Personnel Meeting point 
 India-China Border Roads
 Sino-Indian border dispute

Notes

References

Bibliography

Further reading
 SINO-INDIAN BORDER DEFENSES CHUSHUL AREA (CIA, 1963)

External links
 A place called Chushul, himalaya.com, retrieved 21 November 2020.

Indian Air Force bases
Villages in Durbuk tehsil
Borders of Ladakh